The 1991 Mississippi State Bulldogs football team represented Mississippi State University during the 1991 NCAA Division I-A football season.

Schedule

References

Mississippi State
Mississippi State Bulldogs football seasons
Mississippi State Bulldogs football